Longtown is an unincorporated community in Fairfield County, South Carolina, United States. 

Lottie B. Scott, author and civil rights advocate, was born in Longtown.

References

Unincorporated communities in Fairfield County, South Carolina
Unincorporated communities in South Carolina